Richard Burns Rally is a sim racing game, published by SCi and developed by Warthog with advice of WRC champion Richard Burns (1971–2005).

It was released in July 2004 for PlayStation 2 and Xbox, in September 2004 for Microsoft Windows, and in July 2005 for Gizmondo. A GameCube release was planned but cancelled, similarly North American releases of all but the Gizmondo version were axed due to the lukewarm reception of the game in Europe. Although reviews were mixed, the game is highly praised by gamers due to its complex physics engine and realistic portrayals of real-life courses.

Summary
The game features 8 cars and 36 courses. It simulates both classic and modern rallying, and is best known for its high difficulty and realistic physics engine.

This game is considered by many gamers to be one of the most realistic and difficult racing simulators. Richard Burns Rally initially did not come with official support for user-made content, but despite this, there are mods available due to a large online community, to which Warthog responded by releasing tools to aid in mod development. The add-on Robert Burns Rally modifies all loading screens to include Robert Burns poetry. The game was originally an offline racing game but user-created mods have enabled online play. A sequel to the game is unlikely, due to the death of Richard Burns in 2005 of a brain tumour. In addition, after the PC release, Warthog was sold to Gizmondo, who went bankrupt in 2006. Since the release, the publisher SCi purchased Eidos Interactive in an all-share offer, winning a bidding war from then-former EA man John Riccitiello and Eidos management – though they, in turn, would be purchased by Japanese publisher Square Enix in 2009.

Reception

The game had overall fairly positive reviews. Some detractors, such as gamesradar, claimed it was "too unfriendly to be any fun", and that "therein lies the rub" when you go "tits-up when you hit the ground".

See also
Rally Championship - the previous rally game from the same developer

References

External links
SCI Games page
Warthog Sweden/42-Bit AB page
Richard Burns Rally at MobyGames

2004 video games
Cancelled GameCube games
Gizmondo games
Lua (programming language)-scripted video games
Off-road racing video games
PlayStation 2 games
Racing simulators
Rally racing video games
Video games based on real people
Video games developed in the United Kingdom
Video games with user-generated gameplay content
Windows games
Xbox games